The 2016 IIHF Women's World Championship was the 17th such event hosted by the International Ice Hockey Federation. It was contested in Kamloops, Canada from 28 March to 4 April 2016. Venues included the Sandman Centre, and the McArthur Island Sport and Event Centre.

United States defeated Canada in the gold medal game 1–0 in overtime, securing their seventh title. Russia won the bronze medal by defeating Finland in a shootout.

Venues

Participants

Group A

 – Hosts

Group B

 – Promoted from Division I Group A in 2015

Match officials
10 referees and 9 linesmen were selected for the tournament.

Referees
 Gabrielle Ariano-Lortie
 Melanie Bordeleau
 Anna Eskola
 Drahomira Fialova
 Jerilyn Glenn
 Gabriella Gran
 Nicole Hertrich
 Aina Hove
 Jamie Huntley
 Miyuki Nakayama

Linesman
 Bettina Angerer
 Michaela Frattarelli
 Charlotte Girard
 Jenni Heikkinen
 Veronica Johansson
 Ilona Novotná
 Nataša Pagon
 Vanessa Stratton
 Johanna Tauriainen

Rosters

Each team's roster consisted of at least 15 skaters (forwards, and defencemen) and 2 goaltenders, and at most 20 skaters and 3 goaltenders. All eight participating nations, through the confirmation of their respective national associations, had to submit a roster by the first IIHF directorate.

Preliminary round
The schedule was announced on 16 September 2015.

All times are local (UTC−7).

Group A

Group B

Relegation series
The third and fourth placed team from Group B played a best-of-three series to determine the relegated team.

Final round

Bracket

Quarterfinals

Semifinals

Fifth place game

Bronze medal game

Gold medal game

Statistics

Final standings

Scoring leaders
List shows the top skaters sorted by points, then goals.

GP = Games played; G = Goals; A = Assists; Pts = Points; +/− = Plus/minus; PIM = Penalties in minutes; POS = Position
Source: IIHF.com

Leading goaltenders
Only the top five goaltenders, based on save percentage, who have played at least 40% of their team's minutes, are included in this list.

TOI = Time on ice (minutes:seconds); SA = Shots against; GA = Goals against; GAA = Goals against average; Sv% = Save percentage; SO = Shutouts
Source: IIHF.com

Awards
Best players selected by the directorate:
Best Goaltender:  Emerance Maschmeyer
Best Defenceman:  Jenni Hiirikoski
Best Forward:  Hilary Knight
Source: IIHF.com

All-star team
Goaltender:  Meeri Räisänen
Defence:  Monique Lamoureux,  Jenni Hiirikoski
Forwards:  Hilary Knight,  Rebecca Johnston,  Christine Meier
MVP:  Hilary Knight
Source: IIHF.com

References

External links
Official website

2016
2016 IIHF Women's World Championship
IIHF Women's World Championship
IIHF Women's World Championship
IIHF Women's World Championship
March 2016 sports events in Canada
April 2016 sports events in Canada
Women's ice hockey competitions in Canada
Ice hockey in British Columbia
Sports competitions in British Columbia
2016